Maxym Rylsky Museum (officially known as Kyiv Literary and Memorial Museum of Maxym Rylsky ) is one of the museums in Kyiv, Ukraine, dedicated to Ukrainian poet Maksym Rylsky.

It was founded in 1966 and was opened for visitors 2 years later.

The museum is located at the house where the poet lived for the last 13 years of his life.

The museum exposition includes a collection of poet's manuscripts, a memorial library numbering nearly 10,000 volumes, personal belongings, and art samples from the period 1940-1960s. 

The museum survived 3-time reexposition (1968, 1985, 2006).

References 
 Museums of Kyiv. Guidebook, 2005. - P. 87

External links 
 Official webpage

Museums in Kyiv
Holosiivskyi District